The men's long jump events at the 2014 World Junior Championships in Athletics took place at Hayward Field in Eugene, Oregon on 23 and 24 July.

Medalists

Records

Results

Qualification
Qualification: Standard 7.70 m (Q) or at least 12 best performers (q).

Final
Summary:

References

Long jump
Long jump at the World Athletics U20 Championships